OEMServices SAS (formerly SAVE GIE), or OEMS for short, is a French company involved in the maintenance, repair, overhaul, logistics and customer support of commercial aircraft. It is a joint venture between aerospace giants Safran, Thales, Diehl and Liebherr, acting as their AOG and MRO subsidiary for Aircraft Component Maintenance and spillover support. It is the world's leader in terms of market share of the Airbus A380 as well as the Airbus A350. Indeed, OEMServices supports many airlines and OEM around the world, always emphasizing its trademark of “Fly with the Original".

The company was established in 2009 with Zodiac Aerospace, Thales Group, Diehl Aerospace and Liebherr Aerospace each owning 25%. Zodiac Aerospace was purchased outright by Safran in 2018. The purchase of Zodiac Aerospace by the Safran Group made OEMServices part of the new Safran conglomerate.


Services and clients
 
OEMServices, being the Maintenance, Repair & Overhaul front office for its 4 Parent Companies, is considered a services provider. Its primary service is concentrated in the aircraft maintenance, AOG Desk Support Reliability & Performance Monitoring, as well as the Inventory & Pool Access sub-categories of the aviation industry.

As a direct competitor of Lufthansa's MRO Subsidiary, Lufthansa Technik, Airbus FHS, and Air France-KLM's Engineering & MRO branch, OEMServices offers airlines maintenance on Repair-by-the-Hour, Time & Material and Flat Rate basis. It has exclusive contracts with both legacy carriers and low-cost carriers.

Some of OEMServices' fleets on an exclusive basis include: 
Air Senegal
Air Serbia
Asiana
Egyptair
Emirates
Ethiopian Airlines
Etihad
Japan Airlines
Play
Singapore Airlines

Apart from having contracts with different airlines for the subcontracting of their component maintenance support, OEMServices also provides maintenance under general terms & conditions.

 

Since 2020, OEMServices also provides a tax representation offer to various international OEM, supporting them in their expansion into France and Europe.

As of 2021, OEMServices has an ongoing development of its predictive maintenance capabilities.

Location

OEMServices is as of 2022 capable of providing worldwide services. While growing in France, transferring its operations from Orly Airport to Paris Roissy CDG, OEMServices has also established subsidiairies overseas, having set up capabilities in Atlanta (GA) in 2017, in Singapore in 2019 and an office in Dubai via its parent company Liebherr. As of 2021, OEMServices has set up capabilities in Shanghai, China.

Media appearance
In 2019, OEMServices was awarded at the Trophées PME RMC, 10th edition, a recognized French prize honoring the ambition and innovation of its business.

References

External links 
 
 Airlines Solutions | OEMServices

Safran Group
Aerospace companies of France
Companies based in Paris
Transport companies established in 2009
French companies established in 2009
Logistics companies of France
Thales Group joint ventures
Joint ventures